Grand Hotel Sunny Beach is a 4 star hotel located in Sunny Beach, Bulgaria.

The hotel has 200 rooms and three dining venues, amongst which is an Irish pub. 

It is located 20 metres from the beach and all the rooms include a balcony.

The 14-floor building is the 3rd tallest in Sunny Beach after the Kuban Resort and Aquapark and Hotel Burgas Beach.

See also 
List of hotels in Bulgaria

References

External links 
Homepage
Location on Google Maps.

Hotels in Sunny Beach